Julio César Enciso Espínola (born 23 January 2004) is a Paraguayan professional footballer who plays as a forward for  club Brighton & Hove Albion and the Paraguay national team.

Club career

Early career
Enciso started playing football at his local club, at Caaguazú, Paraguay. At eleven years old he was recruited by the Club Libertad. Enciso made his senior debut for Club Libertad on 17 March 2019, aged 15, in a 4–0 home victory against Deportivo Santaní. He became the youngest player to debut with Libertad.

Brighton & Hove Albion
On 17 June 2022, Enciso transferred to Premier League club Brighton & Hove Albion for a transfer fee of £9.5 million plus future add-on fees, signing an initial four-year contract. He made his Brighton debut on 24 August, playing 80 minutes of the 3–0 away win over League One side Forest Green Rovers in the EFL Cup second round, where he claimed assist to Steven Alzate's long range goal. Enciso made his Premier League debut on 29 October, coming on as a 65th minute substitute for Adam Lallana in Brighton’s 4–1 home win over Chelsea.

International career
Enciso is a Paraguayan youth international, having played with the Paraguay U15 side at the 2019 South American U-15 Championship. He first represented the senior Paraguay national team in a 3–1 2021 Copa América win over Bolivia on 14 June 2021.

Career statistics

Note: Libertad statistics not included in table

International

Honours
Club Libertad
 División Profesional: 2021 Apertura
 Copa Paraguay: 2019

References

External links
 
 

2004 births
Living people
People from Caaguazú Department
Paraguayan footballers
Association football forwards
Paraguay international footballers
Paraguay youth international footballers
Club Libertad footballers
Brighton & Hove Albion F.C. players
Paraguayan Primera División players
Paraguayan expatriate footballers
Expatriate footballers in England
Paraguayan expatriate sportspeople in England